Whitington is an English surname. People with this name include:

Whitington family, influential Australia family, several of whose members are mentioned below
A. O. Whitington (1858–1919) South Australian horse racing official
Craig Whitington (born 1970), English footballer, son of Eric
Don Whitington (1911–1977), Australian political journalist and author
Eric Whitington (born 1946), English footballer, father of Craig
Ernest Whitington (1873–1934), South Australian journalist, pseudonym "Rufus"
Fred T. Whitington (1853–1938), Anglican Archdeacon of Hobart, Tasmania
Mitchel Whitington (born 1959), American author and paranormal researcher
Richard Whitington (1912–1984), Australian cricketer and cricketing writer
William Smallpeice Whitington (c. 1811–1887), progenitor of the Australian family

See also
 Whittington (surname)